Cerrena is a genus of poroid fungi in the family Polyporaceae. The genus was circumscribed by Samuel Frederick Gray in 1821. Gray's type species, Cerrena cinerea, is now known as C. unicolor.

Species
, Index Fungorum accepts seven species of Cerrena:
Cerrena albocinnamomea (Y.C.Dai & Niemelä) H.S.Yuan (2013) – China
Cerrena aurantiopora J.S.Lee & Y.W.Lim (2010) – Korea
Cerrena cystidiata Rajchenb. & De Meijer (1990) – Brazil
Cerrena drummondii (Klotzsch) Zmitr. (2001)
Cerrena sclerodepsis (Berk.) Ryvarden (1976)
Cerrena unicolor (Bull.) Murrill (1903) – widespread
Cerrena zonata (Berk.) H.S.Yuan (2013)

References

Polyporaceae
Polyporales genera
Taxa described in 1821
Taxa named by Samuel Frederick Gray